Boundary Peak may refer to:

 Boundary Peak, the former name of Popes Peak, an historic summit on the Canadian Rockies on the British Columbia border
 any of c. 1000 peaks forming the international boundary between the British Columbia and Yukon, Canada, and Alaska, United States, numbered in sequence; see List of Boundary Peaks of the Alaska-British Columbia border
Boundary Peak (Maine)
Boundary Peak (Nevada)
Boundary Peak Wilderness, Nevada
Boundary Peak (New York), near Avalanche Lake in New York State